Lesbians on Ecstasy is the self-titled debut album of Montreal based electropunk group Lesbians on Ecstasy. It contains 11 songs, including a live bonus track. The first single is the track "Tell Me Does She Love The Bass", a reworking of the 1988 Melissa Etheridge hit "Like the Way I Do".

This record also contains several covers of other Canadian performers. "Pleasure Principal" is an electropunk response to Rough Trade's song "High School Confidential", "Kündstant Krøving" is a take at k.d. lang's biggest hit "Constant Craving", "Parachute Clubbing" is a take on Parachute Club's "Rise Up", and "Bitchsy" references the Fifth Column song "All Women Are Bitches". "Bitchsy" was featured on Queer as Folk during the final season of 2005.

In 2005, The Advocate chose Lesbians on Ecstasy as their 'Number One Album of the Year'.

Track listing
 "Intro" – 1:00
 "Parachute Clubbing" – 3:30
 "Tell Me Does She Love the Bass" – 4:52
 "Pleasure Principal" – 5:10
 "Kündstant Krøving" – 3:55
 "Bitchsy" – 3:19
 "Closer to the Dark" – 3:46
 "Queens of Noise (Bring da Bunny)" – 4:20
 "Revolt" – 5:25
 "Summer Luv" – 3:12
 "Manipulation" – 5:33
 "Superdyke! (Live)" – 4:33

External links
Alien8 Recordings – Record company review of the album.

2004 debut albums
Lesbians on Ecstasy albums
Alien8 Recordings albums